Slingsby may refer to:

 Slingsby (surname)
 Slingsby, North Yorkshire
 Slingsby Aviation, formerly Slingsby Sailplanes, a manufacturer of gliders and other aircraft
 Slingsby Channel, a strait in the Queen Charlotte Strait region of the Central Coast of British Columbia, Canada
 Slingsby Baronets
 HC Slingsby PLC, a historical British company started in 1893